Acupalpus antongilensis is an insect-eating ground beetle of the genus Acupalpus.

References 

antongilensis
Beetles described in 1948